Tomasz Zając (born 14 July 1995) is a Polish footballer who plays as a right winger for Avia Świdnik.

References

External links
 
 

1995 births
Living people
Polish footballers
Poland youth international footballers
Ekstraklasa players
I liga players
II liga players
III liga players
Wisła Kraków players
Chrobry Głogów players
Korona Kielce players
Sandecja Nowy Sącz players
OKS Stomil Olsztyn players
MKP Pogoń Siedlce players
Bałtyk Gdynia players
Wisła Puławy players
Avia Świdnik players
Footballers from Vienna
Association football midfielders